Beat & Motion (stylized as BEAT&MOTION) is a Japanese manga series written and illustrated by Naoki Fujita. It began serialization on Shueisha's Shōnen Jump+ website in February 2023. An anime adaptation is in production.

Production
In June 2021, Shōnen Jump+ launched an eight-part web series titled . On the show, manga artists and their editors competed in a contest, with the grand prize winner getting  in cash, a chance to serialize their manga on Shōnen Jump+ with at least one tankōbon volume being published, and an anime adaptation from Netflix. Beat & Motion won the contest.

Media

Manga
Written and illustrated by Naoki Fujita, the series began serialization on the Shōnen Jump+ manga website on February 25, 2023. At least one collected tankōbon volume will also be released.

Viz Media and Shueisha's Manga Plus service are publishing the series simultaneously with its Japanese release.

Anime
An anime adaptation is in production, with Netflix set to distribute the series globally.

Reception
Robbie Pleasant from Multiversity Comics felt the story was "relatable" and "hard-hitting". He also praised the artwork and its use of small details.

References

External links
  
 

Animation making in anime and manga
Anime series based on manga
Japanese webcomics
Music in anime and manga
Netflix original anime
Shōnen manga
Shueisha manga
Upcoming Netflix original programming
Viz Media manga
Webcomics in print